Bernard W. Deacon is a multidisciplinary academic, based at the Institute of Cornish Studies of the University of Exeter at the Tremough Campus. He has an Open University doctorate and displays his thesis on the ICS website.

Academic career
Deacon has worked for the Open University and Exeter University’s Department of Lifelong Learning. In 2001, he joined the Institute of Cornish Studies and is the director of the Institute's master's degree programme in Cornish Studies.
His main research interests are:
 18th and 19th century Cornish communities
 The Cornish language and its revitalisation
 Cornwall's population and how it has changed
 How peripheral regions are governed
 Who are the Cornish and how their identity is presented

Deacon is a fluent Cornish language speaker, and represents the Institute of Cornish Studies on the Cornish Language Partnership. In 2007, he was re-elected as Chairman of Cussel an Tavaz Kernuak (The Cornish Language Council).

Publications

In book form
 
 
 
 
 
  (hardback)  (paperback)
  (small format paperback, lavishly illustrated).
  (paperback).

In Cornish studies
Deacon has prolific publications in learned journals. The following were published in the Institute's journal (published by the University of Exeter Press):

Work in progress
 Cornish surnames, their origin and spread

References

External links
 The Cornish Community Programme: Working papers: includes work by Bernard Deacon.

Education in Cornwall
Academics of the University of Exeter
People educated at Liskeard Grammar School
Living people
British historians
Historians of Cornwall
Writers from Cornwall
Cornish nationalists
Cornish culture
Cornish language
Cornish-speaking people
Year of birth missing (living people)